YER may refer to:
Yemeni rial, the currency of the Republic of Yemen
Fort Severn Airport, which has "YER" as its IATA airport code

See also
Yer